Sergei Alexandrovich Zubov (Russian: Сергей Александрович Зубов; born 22 July 1970) is a Russian professional ice hockey coach and former defenceman. He is the former head coach for the Dinamo Riga of the Kontinental Hockey League (KHL).

Zubov played for the Dallas Stars, New York Rangers and Pittsburgh Penguins of the National Hockey League as well as SKA Saint Petersburg of the KHL. One of the best offensive defensemen in NHL history, he won the Stanley Cup twice: with the Rangers in 1994 and the Stars in 1999. He was inducted into the Hockey Hall of Fame as part of the class of 2019.

Playing career

CSKA Moscow, New York Rangers and Pittsburgh Penguins
Zubov was drafted in the fifth round of the 1990 NHL Entry Draft by the New York Rangers. Prior to this, he played for the Red Army's hockey team, HC CSKA Moscow, in Russia. He continued to play for the Red Army until 1992, after the dissolution of the Soviet Union. Although Sergei spent some of his rookie season with New York's AHL affiliate, the Binghamton Rangers, he played forty-nine games as a rookie for the Rangers, scoring 31 points, considered then to be above-average for a defenseman. Zubov's high-scoring ways continued, as he scored 12 goals and earned 77 assists during the 1993–94 season, which led the team in regular season scoring. He contributed 19 points to the Rangers' playoff campaign, as he, along with Alexander Karpovtsev, Sergei Nemchinov, and Alexei Kovalev became the first Russians to have their names engraved on the Stanley Cup.

Zubov continued to play well for the Rangers, but on 31 August 1995, he was traded to the Pittsburgh Penguins with Petr Nedvěd for Ulf Samuelsson and Luc Robitaille. Zubov only spent one season in Pittsburgh, it was rumored because he and team captain Mario Lemieux didn't get along, especially on the powerplay where both men wanted to be in control. Ultimately, he was traded to the Dallas Stars on 22 June 1996 for Kevin Hatcher.

Dallas Stars
Although Zubov never again reached the scoring height of his 1993–94 season with the Rangers, due to a combination of Dallas's more defensive system and decreased scoring in general, he has earned all three of his trips to the All-Star game with the Stars. He never again reached an 80+ point total, but had 11 consecutive years of 40+ point seasons and 30+ assists.

He was also excellent defensively and while he had a well-sized body, he was known more for his positioning and puck-dislodging abilities out of corners rather than his checking abilities. He had been a mainstay on the penalty killing squad for several years and had only recorded a negative plus/minus four times in his career, with two of them within his first three years in the league.

Zubov always played a solid game, but for years went under the radar and did not garner any nominations for the NHL awards or the NHL First/Second All-Star teams. However, in the 2005–06 season, Zubov posted 71 points for his highest outing in over a decade – and also received his first Norris Trophy nomination.

Zubov missed nearly half of the 2007–08 NHL season with a sports hernia injury and most of the 2008–09 NHL season with a hip injury.

SKA Saint Petersburg
On 30 July 2009, he decided to leave the NHL as he signed a contract with SKA Saint Petersburg of the Kontinental Hockey League (KHL). He was also selected as a reserve by Team Russia for the 2010 Winter Olympics should an injury occur during the tournament.

On 18 April 2011, it was reported that Zubov would officially retire due to hip-related injury problems.

Coaching career
On 20 July 2015, Zubov was named to the coaching staff of the Russian national team as a defensive assistant.

Zubov served as the head coach of HC Sochi starting from the 2017–18 season. He was dismissed as head coach 16 games into the 2019–20 season following a 5–11 start.

He currently serves as Senior Consultant to Hockey Operations for the Dallas Stars.

International play
Zubov represented the Soviet Union where he won the gold and silver medals in 1989 and 1990 in the Junior Division.

Zubov won a gold medal at the 1992 Winter Olympics, playing for the Unified Team.

Legacy
 In the 2009 book 100 Ranger Greats, Zubov was ranked No. 72 all-time of the 901 New York Rangers who had played during the team's first 82 seasons
 Zubov left the NHL as the league's all-time scoring leader for Russian-born defensemen. He is now 2nd behind Sergei Gonchar.
 On 28 January 2022, the Dallas Stars retired Zubov's number 56.

Personal life
Zubov and his wife, Irina, have two children.

Career statistics

Regular season and playoffs

* Stanley Cup Champion.

International

Awards and honors

Records

NHL
Points by a Russian-born defenseman, single season, 89 (1993–94)

Dallas Stars
Points by a defenseman, regular season (553)
Points by a defenseman, playoff (72)

See also
 List of NHL players with 1000 games played
 List of NHL statistical leaders by country

References

External links

1970 births
Living people
Binghamton Rangers players
Dallas Stars players
HC CSKA Moscow players
Hockey Hall of Fame inductees
Ice hockey players at the 1992 Winter Olympics
Medalists at the 1992 Winter Olympics
National Hockey League All-Stars
New York Rangers draft picks
New York Rangers players
Olympic gold medalists for the Unified Team
Olympic ice hockey players of the Unified Team
Olympic medalists in ice hockey
Pittsburgh Penguins players
Russian ice hockey defencemen
SKA Saint Petersburg players
Soviet ice hockey defencemen
Ice hockey people from Moscow
St. Louis Blues personnel
Stanley Cup champions